Proline rich 9 is a protein that in humans is encoded by the PRR9 gene.

References

Further reading